The first season of the Philippine television series Masked Singer Pilipinas premiered on TV5 on October 24, 2020, and concluded on December 26, 2020. The inaugural season was won by Daryl Ong as "2-2-B", with Katrina Velarde as "Diwata" as the runner-up, and Carlyn Ocampo in third place as "Pusa-way".

Production
Viva originally began developing a local Philippine adaptation of the franchise in 2016 with Cesar Montano as the host and GB Sampedro as the director. Two pilot episodes of the series were filmed to be presented to TV5 management with a planned premiere in June 2016. However, the series was eventually shelved due to budget concerns and to some extent disagreements by the audience and the management.

On 24 September 2020, TV5 hinted a new show with a poster of a mysterious mask. This was further confirmed on the same day. The filming of the show started on October 6, 2020.

Panelists and host

In August 2020, Billy Crawford confirmed that he will be hosting a show in October of the same year. On 3 September 2020, Crawford was confirmed to host the show.

On 26 September 2020, Aga Muhlach, Cristine Reyes, Kim Molina, and Matteo Guidicelli were revealed as the permanent panelists of the show. A guest panelist occasionally enters with a mask and joins the four permanent panelists.

Guest panelists regularly joined the panel, appearing onstage with a mask. These included Julia Barretto as "Kitty Perry" in the fourth episode, Hajji Alejandro as "Bantay" in the fifth episode, Nonoy Zuñiga as "Oso Taulava" in the sixth, Sam Concepcion as "Robot Mortiz" in the seventh, and Mark Bautista as "Mask Alvarado" in the eighth. Barretto returned to the panel on the penultimate episode as a guest judge.

Contestants
The first season featured 12 celebrity contestants, all being professional singers.

Episodes

Week 1 (24 October)

Week 2 (31 October)

Week 3 (7 November)

Week 4 (14 November)

Week 5 (21 November)

Week 6 (28 November)

Week 7 (5 December)

Week 8 (12 December)

Week 9 (19 December)

Week 10 (26 December)

References

Masked Singer
2020 Philippine television seasons